"Rise" is the first single released by Daryl Braithwaite from his third studio album, Rise. The single was released in November 1990 and peaked at number 23 on the ARIA Chart. "Rise" was originally written and performed by The Chosen Few.

Track listing
CD single
 "Rise" – 3:56
 "Where the Famous Came Out to Play" – 4:28

Charts

References

1990 songs
1990 singles
CBS Records singles
Song recordings produced by Simon Hussey